Kevin Bailey may refer to:
 Kevin Bailey (poet) (born 1954), British poet
 Kevin Bailey (politician), Texas state representative, 1991–2009
Kevin Bailey, vocalist in The Shoppe